Dallas Observer is a free digital and print publication based in Dallas, Texas. The Observer publishes daily online coverage of local news, restaurants, music, and arts, as well as longform narrative journalism. A weekly print issue circulates every Thursday. The Observer has been owned by Voice Media Group since January 2013.

The Observer is a member of the Association of Alternative Newsmedia. It has won dozens of national and regional awards for its journalism, including two first places for longtime columnist Jim Schutze in the 2017 AAN Awards. In 1995, the H.L. Mencken Writing Award went to columnist Laura Miller, who went on to become the mayor of Dallas after leaving the Observer. In 2007, two Observer reporters, Jesse Hyde and Megan Feldman, were named finalists in the Livingston Awards for Young Journalists.

History 
The Observer was started in October 1980 by partners Ken Kirk, Bob Walton, Jeff Wilmont, and Gregg Wurdeman as a weekly local arts and cinema review publication. In 1991, the Observer was bought by New Times Media. In 2005, New Times  both acquired  and adopted the corporate name of Village Voice Media. In September 2012, Village Voice Media executives Scott Tobias, Christine Brennan, and Jeff Mars bought Village Voice Media's papers and associated web properties from its founders and formed Voice Media Group.

See also

References

Further reading

External links
 
 

Newspapers published in the Dallas–Fort Worth metroplex
Alternative weekly newspapers published in the United States
1980 establishments in Texas
Weekly newspapers published in Texas